The Third Affiliated Hospital of  Xinjiang Medical University, also known as  the Cancer Hospital of Xinjiang Medical University　() is a teaching hospital in Urumqi, Xinjiang, China affiliated with Xinjiang Medical University.

External links 
 Hospital profile

Xinjiang Medical University
Hospital buildings completed in 1989
Hospital XMU 3
Hospitals in Xinjiang
Hospitals established in 1989
1989 establishments in China